Carl Clemons-Hopkins is an American actor, best known for portraying Marcus on the HBO Max comedy-drama series Hacks (2021–present). They were nominated for the 2021 Primetime Emmy Award for Outstanding Supporting Actor in a Comedy Series for the role.

Early life 
Clemons-Hopkins was born in Lithonia, Georgia and attended high school in Snellville, Georgia.

Career
Clemons-Hopkins has acted in numerous stage plays. In 2014, they were nominated for a Barrymore Award for Excellence in Theater, which honors Philadelphia-area theater productions, in the category of "Outstanding Supporting Actor in a Musical" for their performance in Little Shop of Horrors. Their performances in 2016 included Time Is On Our Side, in which they were hailed as "immensely likable and sympathetic," and Richard III. In September 2016, they began performing as an original cast member in the new Chicago company of Hamilton.

Clemons-Hopkins began pursuing television and film opportunities after watching the 2016 film Moonlight. After seeing the film, they wrote in their journal, "I know there will never be another Moonlight, but if there’s another opportunity like this, I want to be ready."

In 2021, Clemons-Hopkins began starring on the HBO Max comedy-drama series Hacks. For the role, they received a nomination for the Primetime Emmy Award for Outstanding Supporting Actor in a Comedy Series. They starred in the slasher film Candyman, which was released on August 27, 2021. In 2022, they starred as James Baldwin opposite Crystal Dickinson as Nikki Giovanni in Lessons in Survival: 1971 at the Vineyard Theatre. The play follows when Giovanni interviewed Baldwin on the TV show Soul!

Prior to being cast in Hacks, Clemons-Hopkins had planned to stop acting and was actively preparing to apply for business school.

Personal life 
Clemons-Hopkins is queer and non-binary. They use they/them and he/him pronouns.

Filmography

Film

Television

Theater

Awards and nominations

References

External links 
 
 

21st-century American actors
African-American actors
American film actors
American musical theatre actors
American non-binary actors
American television actors
LGBT African Americans
LGBT people from Georgia (U.S. state)
Living people
Year of birth missing (living people)
Queer actors
21st-century African-American people
21st-century American LGBT people